Twin Towers is a 2002 short documentary film directed by Bill Guttentag and Robert David Port, depicting the September 11, 2001 attacks on the World Trade Center. It is about two brothers, policeman Joseph Vigiano and fireman John Vigiano Jr., and their actions during the attacks. The film was awarded an Oscar for Best Documentary Short at the 2003 Academy Awards honoring films released in the year 2002.

See also
 List of American films of 2002
 List of firefighting films

References

External links
 

2002 films
2002 short documentary films
Best Documentary Short Subject Academy Award winners
American short documentary films
Films about firefighting
Films directed by Bill Guttentag
Documentary films about the September 11 attacks
2000s English-language films
2000s American films